The Seven Brothers Islands, also known as the Sawabi Islands or Seba Islands, is an archipelago in the Dact-el-Mayun section of the Bab-el-Mandeb strait (between the Red Sea and the Gulf of Aden). They are within the Obock District of Djibouti, and are a notable diving site.  Even in English publications, the group is often called by its French name, Sept Frères.

Geography

 West Island, or Red Island (H̱amra), 62 m high
 Double Island (Ounḏa Dâbali), 46 m high
 Low Island (Tolka), 17 m high
 Big Island (Kaḏḏa Dâbali), 114 m high
 East Island (H̱orod le ‘Ale), 83 m high
 South Island (‘Ounḏa Kômaytou), 47 m high

The "seventh brother" is not an island, but the volcanic hill at the northern tip of the Ras Siyyan peninsula.

All the islets are surrounded by reefs. All are brownish, except Big Island which is yellowish.  There is a masonry marker on the summit of Big Island.

Climate
The warmest month of the year is July with an average temperature of 39.0 °C. The archipelago consists of the main island of Kaḏḏa Dâbali, the five smaller islands of Ounḏa Dâbali, H̱amra, Tolka, H̱orod le ‘Ale and Ounḏa Kômaytou, as well as small rock outcrops that are uninhabitable by humans but important for seabirds. The sky is always clear and bright throughout the year. The climate of Seven Brothers Islands is classified in the Köppen climate classification as BWh, meaning a desert climate with a mean annual temperature over 29 °C or 84 °F.

References

Islands of Djibouti